Pondatti Sonna Kettukanum is a 1991 Indian Tamil-language comedy drama film written and directed by V. Sekhar. The film was produced by K. Parthiban, Vetriyur K. Sethu and A. Rajendran under Jayalakshmi Art Creations. The film stars Bhanupriya, Chandrasekhar with Goundamani, Senthil, Charle and Chinni Jayanth portraying supporting roles.

The film's cinematography and editing was handled by G. Rajendran and A. P. Manivannan. The film's soundtrack was composed by Chandrabose.

Plot 
The film revolves around three wives who decided to teach lesson to their chauvinist husbands.

Cast 

Bhanupriya as Indira
Chandrasekhar as Indira's Husband
Goundamani as Dharmalingam
Senthil as Villager
Manorama as Dharmalingam's Wife
Charle
Kumarimuthu
Chinni Jayanth
Kovai Sarala as Thangam
Devishree as Girija
Thideer Kannaiah  as Police officer
Vetri
Meera
Vetri Vigneshwar
MLA Thangaraj as Police officer

Soundtrack
Soundtrack was composed by Chandrabose and lyrics were written by Vaali and Muthulingam.
Pondatti Sonna - Mano, Chithra, Deepan Chakravarthy, Lalitha Sagari
Chinna Chinna Varigal - S. P. Balasubramaniam
Jolluthan Jolluthan - S. P. Balasubramaniam, Chithra
Vandhale - S. Janaki, Vani Jayaram, P. Susheela
Naanthaan Di - S. P. Shailaja

Reception
C. R. K. of Kalki gave a mixed review for the film citing that film which promised to revolve around a revolutionary woman but breaks anticipation around it and the film wanders around aimlessly. He also noted that Bhanupriya and Chandrasekhar were wasted but appreciated Goundamani's performance.

Remakes

References

External links 

1990s Tamil-language films
1991 comedy-drama films
1991 films
Films directed by V. Sekhar
Indian comedy-drama films
Tamil films remade in other languages